Prosopocera myops is a species of beetle in the family Cerambycidae. It was described by Chevrolat in 1855. It is known from Nigeria, the Ivory Coast, the Republic of the Congo, the Democratic Republic of the Congo, and Sierra Leone.

Varietas
 Prosopocera myops var. dorsalis Chevrolat, 1858
 Prosopocera myops var. foxcrofti (Pascoe, 1864)

References

Prosopocerini
Beetles described in 1855